South Korea participated in the 2013 Asian Indoor and Martial Arts Games in Incheon, South Korea on 29 June – 6 July

South Korea sent 121 athletes which competed in 9 sports.

Medal summary

Medal table

Medalists

References

External links 

Asian Indoor and Martial Arts Games
Korea, South
2013